The Allied Command Europe Mobile Force (AMF) was a small NATO quick reaction force, headquartered at Heidelberg, Germany, active from 1960 to 2002. It formed part of Allied Command Europe (ACE), headquartered at SHAPE at Casteau, Belgium. The land component of the force, consisting of a brigade-sized formation of about 5,000 personnel, was composed of units from 14 NATO states.
HQ CO US AMF(L) Infantry was at Coleman Barracks, Mannheim, GE 95-02
HQ AMF (L) was at Sullivan Barracks, Mannheim, 1975-78.

ACE Mobile Force (Land)
The ACE Mobile Force-Land or AMF(L) was intended as a multinational force that could be quickly despatched to any part of ACE's command area - from North Norway, to Germany, to eastern Turkey - to demonstrate the solidarity of the alliance and its ability to resist all forms of aggression against any member state. During the Cold War the AMF-L did frequent exercises in North Norway and in other areas. The Bundeswehr responded to the request of NATO from December 9, 1960, from January 1961 to provide a paratrooper battalion, a medical company, an airborne telecommunications company, and air transport units.

In October 1961 Bundeswehr units, including parts of the 1st Airborne Division (the Parachute Battalion 262) in the AMF in October 1961 in Sardinia during Exercise First Try in part, on the Belgian, British and American soldiers were also involved. In November 1965, the Parachute Battalion 262 took part in the AMF maneuver Eastern Express II on the southeast flank of NATO, which took place in Turkey under the leadership of the AMF commander Major General Michael Fitzalan-Howard (UK). In total, 3,500 soldiers from the US, UK, Belgium, Germany and Italy participated in the maneuvers. In 1967 the maneuver Sunshine Express in Greece, also with German participation.

In 1970 at Narvik in northern Norway on the north flank of NATO, the AMF United maneuver Arctic Express with 4000 soldiers.

It was first deployed operationally in 1991 during the Gulf War, when part of its air component was dispatched to watch the Turkish borders, in the face of a potential threat to a member's territory.

The AMF(L) was one of the NATO formations deployed to Norway during Exercise Strong Resolve 1998.

The AMF(L) formed the core of the Albania Force (AFOR), a NATO-led international force responsible for establishing and delivering humanitarian aid to refugees from Kosovo in Albania during the Kosovo crisis in 1999. It was led by Major General John Reith, Commander AMF(L).

The Immediate Reaction Task Force (Land) (IRTF-L) was a novel command and control concept successfully developed and evaluated by the AMF(L) between 1999 and 2001. The IRTF(L) concept allowed the AMF(L), an existing Immediate Reaction Force multinational brigade HQ, to command a divisional sized force with minimal augmentation and no intermediate HQs. The trial concluded in December 2001.

The Telegraph wrote that NATO had to disband the ACE Mobile Force, '..after Britain withdrew its contribution to ensure troops were available to join any US attack on Iraq. Britain's contribution to [the force] included key support troops, without which the 6,000-strong force could not operate. With no other NATO member prepared to contribute more soldiers, the alliance had no choice but to disband it.'

HQ AMF(L) was disbanded on October 31, 2002 and has since been replaced by the NATO Response Force.

Exercises 

The ACE Mobile Force took part in a large number of exercises.
1961 First Try, Sardinia
1962 Southern Express, Greece
1963 Finnmark, Norway
1963 Summer Marmara Express, Greece
1965 Eastern Express, Turkey
1966 Summer Marmara Express, Greece and Turkey
1967 Sunshine Express, Greece
1968 Greece
1969 Olympic Express, Turkey
1970 Deep Express, Turkey
1970 Arctic Express, Narvik, Norway
1971 Hellenic Express, Greece
1972 Canadian Club, Germany
1975 Deep Express, Turkey
1975 Advent Express, Great Britain
1976 Halina Express, Great Britain
1977 Schwarzer Husar, Great Britain
1980 Anorak Express, Norway
1980 Ardent Ground, Great Britain
1981 Amber Express, Denmark
1981 Ardent Ground, Portugal
1982 Ardent Ground, Portugal
1983 Ardent Ground, Belgium
1984 Ardent Ground, Great Britain
1985 Archway Express, Turkey
1986 Ardent Ground, Belgium
1987 Ardent Ground, Great Britain. Members of the Allied Command Europe Mobile Force from Belgium, the Netherlands, West Germany, Italy, Luxembourg, the United Kingdom and the United States participated in the live artillery/air exercise ARDENT GROUND '87 at Salisbury Plain Training Area in Wiltshire.
1987 Accord Express, Denmark
1987 Aurora Express, Turkey
1988 Arrowhead Express, Norway
1988 Alley Express, Turkey
1989 Ardent Ground, Italy
1989 Armanda Exchange, Pavia di Udine and Paularo, Italy
1989 Action Express, Denmark
1990 Array Encounter 90, Norway
1991 Alley Express, Denmark
1992 Ardent Ground, Otterburn, Northumberland, Great Britain
1992 Alley Express, Turkey
1993 Arena Exchange, Umbria, Italy
1993 Action Express, Denmark
1993 Ardent Ground, Belgium
1994 Arctic Express, Bardudoss, Norway
1994 Ardent Ground, Baumholder, Germany
1994 Arrow Exchange, Gaziantep, Turkey
1995 Strong Resolve, Trondheim, Norway
1995 Arctic Express, Norway
1996 Cooperative Adventure Express, Belgium
1997 Adventure Express, Norway
1997 Ardent Ground, Turkey
1998 Cooperative Adventure Exchange, Slovenia
1998 Strong Resolve, Norway
1998 Strong Resolve, Portugal
1999 Adventure Exchange, Italy
2000 Joint Winter, Norway
2000 Ardent Ground, Hungary
2000 Adventure Exchange, Greece
2001 Adventure Exchange, Turkey
2002 Cooperative Adventure Exchange, Ukraine

References

NATO Handbook, 50th Anniversary Edition, 1998–99, p. 253, 255
NATO website describing AFOR

Further reading
Lieutenant Colonel Calvin H. Creasy, A perspective of the ACE mobile force, Military Review, November 1975
Exercise Adventure Express 97 at Globalsecurity.org
Maloney, Sean (2004) 'Fire Brigade or Tocsin? NATO's ACE Mobile Force, Flexible Response and the Cold War', Journal of Strategic Studies, 27:4, pp. 585–613

Formations of the NATO Military Command Structure
Military units and formations established in 1960
Military units and formations disestablished in 2002